Vivian Adelberg Rudow (born 1936) is an American composer, performance artist, conductor and concert producer. She composes in the genres of acoustic and electroacoustic music with works ranging from solo to full orchestra. She lives in Baltimore, Maryland.

Education

Adelberg Rudow received a Bachelor of Music degree in piano in 1960 and a Master of Music degree in composition from the Peabody Institute of Johns Hopkins University in 1979. She studied piano with Austin Conradi and composition with Jean Eichelberger Ivey and Robert Hall Lewis. Her earliest composition and theory studies were under Grace Newsom Cushman at the Junior Conservatory Camp (a predecessor of The Walden School).

Awards and honors

Adelberg Rudow has won multiple ASCAP Plus Awards since 1987. In 1982 her Force III was premiered by the Baltimore Symphony Orchestra under Sergiu Comissiona and she became the first Maryland composer to have an orchestral work performed in the new Joseph Meyerhoff Symphony Hall. In 1986, Rudow’s composition, With Love; a fantasy for live cello and decorated cello cases, in memory of Myrtle Hollins Adelberg won First Prize in the 14th International Electroacoustic Music Composition Competition in Bourges, France in the Program Division. Adelberg Rudow won First Prize in the International Double Reed Society Composition Contest for her piece Kaddish for solo bassoon, and additionally received a Maryland State Arts Council Fellowship, a City Arts Individual Artist Grant and a Meet-the-Composer Grant.

Career

Adelberg Rudow’s music has been performed worldwide. Her composition Urbo Turbo was recorded by the London Philharmonic Orchestra. She has frequently collaborated with award-winning Maryland poet Grace Cavalieri, including three satellite radio specials of her music in Cavalieri’s "Poet and the Poem" satellite radio broadcasts. Adelberg Rudow has developed her own style of performance art presentations named “The Vivian.” In 2000, she premiered her performance art piece Juan Blanco, Cuban Lawyer Variations of Variations in Havana during the International Electroacoustic Music Festival “Spring Time in Havana” for the 80th birthday of Juan Blanco, Director of the Cuban Electroacoustic Music studio. She performed the piece again in August 2001 at the Kennedy Center in Washington, DC during a Sonic Circuits concert. She was the founding artistic director of Res Musica Baltimore, later Res MusicAmerica, a successful organization active between 1980 and 1991 dedicated to presenting the works of living American composers. In 1988, she produced an International Electroacoustic Music Festival in Baltimore.

Discography

Love, Loss and Law, in memory of Myrtle Hollins Adelberg and Harry Adelberg. Music Documentaries: “With Love,” “Portrait of a Friend,” and “Portraits of Lawyers,” (originally The Velvet Hammers). December, 2009
Le Chant du Monde, Harmonia Mundi Label, with the Bourges winners of the 16th composition contest 1988, “With Love,” Paula Skolnick-Virizlay, Violoncello.
Electroshock Records– Various Electroacoustic Music, Vol. VIII (2003) “Racing Inside The Milky Way.”
Electroshock Records– Various Electroacoustic Music, Vol. IX (2004) “Cuban Lawyer, Juan Blanco.”
Sunbursts, solo piano works by 7 American women, Nanette Kaplan Solomon, pianist “Rebecca’s Suite,” Leonarda label, LE 345

Selected works

Americana Visited Variations (violin or viola and piano), 1984
Ars Nova (two bassoons), 1981
Call For Peace (flute plus tape), 2006
Changing Space (prepared tape for dance), 1972
Clouds of Memories, 2002
Cuban Lawyer, Juan Blanco, excerpt from Portraits of Lawyers originally The Velvet Hammers (tape), 2000
Dan’s Suite, in memory of Daniel Malkin, (cello and piano)
Lament (with optional narrator, text: Carole Malkin “Passover Questions”), 1997
The Bare Smooth Stone of Your Love (with optional narrator, text: Carole Malkin “Cello Recital”), 1998
Dawn’s Journey, in memory of Dawn Culbertson
(piano and tape), 2005
(audio and DVD)
Devy's Song (treble instrument and piano), 1984
Dark Waters of Elba (orchestra), 2005
Deepwater Horizons: Will We Sleep Again? (flute and piano), 2011
Earth Day Suite:
Dark Waters Of The Chesapeake, (orchestra), 2010
Go Green! (flute concerto, orchestra), 2010
Fanfare For My Hero, In The Pin Striped Suit (full orchestra), 1993
Force III (full orchestra),1979
The Head Remembers Victims, of W.W.II, (saxophone and prepared tape), 2008
The Healing Place VI (flute, clarinet, violin, viola, violoncello, prepared tape, optional narrator, text: Grace Cavalieri), 1991
I Pledge My Love, 1992
(tenor and string quartet)
(tenor and piano)
John’s Song, in memory of John J. Hill, (voice or instrument and keyboard), 2006
Journey of Waters (voice and 11 member ensemble, lyrics: Grace Cavalieri), 1994
Journey of Waters (voice and piano), 1984
Journey of Waters (small orchestra), 1991
Journey of Waters II (new orchestral arrangement and voice), 2006
Kaddish, in memory of Isaac Hollins, (solo bassoon) 1975
No Rest For Devy's Spirit (solo viola), 1984
Not Me! (violin, cello, and piano), 1989
The Ocean Sings (guitar orchestra, or 5 guitars and solo viola), 2010
Portrait of A Friend (tenor and prepared tape, text: Grace Cavalieri), 1986.
Portraits of Lawyers, (sound collage, art music documentary) 1989-2004
Purple Ice, 8-10 songs (voice and piano, lyrics: Grace Cavalieri), 1984–92
Rebecca's Suite, in memory of Rebecca Blackwell (solo piano)
Rebecca’s Song, 1989
Rebecca’s Rainbow Racing Among the Stars, 1991
The Sky Speaks, 1. Clouds (SSAATTBB chorus, soprano and violoncello solo, piano and 2 percussion), revised 2007
Urbo Turbo (Urban Turbulence)
(full orchestra, alternate title: Spirit of America), 1999
(full orchestra and chorus), revised 2008
Weeping Rocker III (chamber orchestra and SATB chorus), 1993
With Love, a fantasy for live cello and cello cases in memory of Myrtle Hollins Adelberg (cello and prepared tape), 1986

References

External links 
 Vivian Adelberg Rudow Official Website
 Howard County Times 4/15/10 Interview
 The Baltimore Composers Forum
 Pytheas Center for Contemporary Music
 IAWN Article 2004
 Roland Park News Interview Winter 2010/2011
 Baltimore Sun, Ernest M. Imhoff "After 11 seasons, Res Music America finds it 'impossible to continue'" 5/29/1991
 Performance in Sonic Circuit concert at the Kennedy Center

1936 births
Living people
20th-century classical composers
American women classical composers
American classical composers
Musicians from Baltimore
Peabody Institute alumni
American women in electronic music
20th-century American composers
20th-century American women musicians
20th-century women composers
21st-century American women